Gunderson may refer to:

People
Gunderson is a surname of Norwegian and Swedish origin. Notable people with the surname include:
Lance Armstrong (born Lance Edward Gunderson; 1971), American cyclist
Carl Gunderson (1864–1933), American politician, South Dakota State Senate
Eric Gunderson (psychologist) (1923–2015), American psychologist 
Eric Gunderson (born 1966), American Major League Baseball player
Foluke Gunderson (born 1987), American Olympic volleyball player
Jerome O. Gunderson (1923–2016), American farmer, businessman, and politician, Minnesota State Senate
John Gunderson  (born 1980), American mixed martial artist
John G. Gunderson (1923–2019), American psychiatrist
Lauren Gunderson (born 1982), American playwright, screenwriter, and short story author
Ryan Gunderson (born 1985), American professional hockey player
Steve Gunderson (actor), American actor
Steven Gunderson (born 1951), American politician
Ted Gunderson (1928–2011), American private investigator and FBI special agent
Fay Peck (maiden name Gunderson; 1931–2016), American Expressionist painter

Fictional characters
Alice Gunderson, in the soap opera General Hospital
Buzz Gunderson, in the movie Rebel Without A Cause 
Gil Gunderson, in The Simpsons
Marge Gunderson, in the movie Fargo
Marten Gunderson, a minor villain of the video game Tomb Raider: The Angel of Darkness
 Skye Gunderson, from the animated series Get Blake!
Walter Gunderson, mayor of Pawnee in Parks and Recreation

Other uses 
Gundersen Hall, Oklahoma State University, Stillwater, Oklahoma
Gunderson High School, San Jose, California
Gunderson, the predecessor to The Greenbrier Companies

See also
Gundersen (disambiguation)
Gundersen (surname)

Norwegian-language surnames
Swedish-language surnames